Kendrick Stark (1904–1988) was a rugby union international who represented England from 1927 to 1928.

Early life
Kendrick Stark was born on 18 August 1904 in Edmonton.

Rugby football
Stark made his international debut on 15 January 1927 at Twickenham in the England vs Wales match.
Of the 9 matches he played for his national side he was on the winning side on 7 occasions.
He played his final match for England on 17 March 1928 at Twickenham in the England vs Scotland match.

References

1904 births
1988 deaths
English rugby union players
England international rugby union players
People educated at Dulwich College
Rugby union players from Edmonton, London
Rugby union props